The 1894 Trinity Bantams football team represented the Trinity College during the 1894 college football season.

Schedule

References

Trinity
Trinity Bantams football seasons
Trinity Bantams football